Village-Blanchard is a settlement in New Brunswick, Canada.  This village was called Blanchard Settlement until 2010.

History

Notable people

See also
List of communities in New Brunswick

References

Settlements in New Brunswick
Communities in Gloucester County, New Brunswick
Local service districts of Gloucester County, New Brunswick